Min Zhuang is a recently described Tai language spoken in the Langheng (郎恒) area of Funing County, Yunnan, China, and possibly also southwestern Guangxi province. All speakers are reportedly bilingual in Yei Zhuang (also known as Guibian Zhuang or Sha), which is classified as Northern Tai (Johnson 2011a). The language was first described in 2011 by Eric C. Johnson of SIL International, though it had been earlier mentioned in Kullavanijaya and L-Thongkum (1998).

Names

Classification
Johnson (2011b) reported Min Zhuang to share many features with Nong Zhuang, a Central Tai language. However, it is unintelligible with the more widely spoken Nong Zhuang, Yei Zhuang, and Dai Zhuang languages.

Distribution
Min Zhuang is spoken by about 2,600 people in 11 villages. With the exception of Shangmabu (上麻布), all of the following villages are purely made up of Min Zhuang speakers.

Guixun-Anhe (贵训-安哈)
Sankeshu (三颗数)
Xionggu (雄估)
Shangmabu (上麻布) - mixed with Nong Zhuang speakers
Tianfang (田房)
Getao (戈桃)
Gezao (戈造)
Gecai (戈才)
Bagan (叭干)
Na'en (那恩)
Longnong (龙弄)

Johnson (2011b) reports that Min Zhuang is also likely to be spoken in southwestern Guangxi.

Notes

References
 Johnson, Eric C. 2011a. "The Southern Zhuang Languages of Yunnan Province's Wenshan Prefecture from a Sociolinguistic Perspective." [Working paper]. S.l.: s.n. 49 pages.
 Johnson, Eric C. 2011b. "A Lexical and Phonological Comparison of the Central Taic Languages of Wenshan Prefecture, China: Getting More Out of Language Survey Wordlists Than Just Lexical Similarity Percentages." SIL Electronic Working Papers 2011-005: 170.
 Kullavanijaya, Pranee and L-Thongkum, Theraphan. 1998. "Linguistic criteria for determining Tai ethnic groups: case studies on Central and south-western Tais." Proceedings [of] the International Conference on Tai Studies, July 29–31, 1998, Bangkok.

Tai languages